Steven Marsh is a game designer who has worked for Steve Jackson Games.

Career
Like many game industry professionals of the 1990s, Steven Marsh was first involved in periodicals; a letter he wrote to Shadis Magazine about what would be a "perfect issue" was translated into the special "Steven Marsh" issue.  He was subsequently hired by Steve Jackson Games to be the editor of the second (online) and third (.pdf) incarnations of Pyramid.

Steven Marsh has worked for Steve Jackson Games as e23 Manager as well as Pyramid Editor. In addition to writing for SJG's GURPS and In Nomine lines, Marsh also contributed to Green Ronin Games's Mutants and Masterminds RPG, West End Games's D6 System, and White Wolf's Werewolf: the Forsaken, as well as Fright Night: Polar Terror for the D20 system.

Steven Marsh has on-line references at:

Pyramid Chat 03/29/00: Dr. Kromm and David Pulver
[WEB] Steve Jackson Games Daily Illuminator - May 2002
[WEB] OGRE postings on old Illuminati BBS from 1-92 through 1-93.
[WEB] Steve Jackson Games Daily Illuminator - June 2000
[WEB] Steve Jackson Games Daily Illuminator - February 2000
[WEB] Steve Jackson Games Daily Illuminator - February 2002
[WEB] Steve Jackson Games Daily Illuminator - May 2000
[WEB] Steve Jackson Games Daily Illuminator - November 2002
[WEB] Steve Jackson Games Daily Illuminator - March 2000
[WEB] Steve Jackson Games Daily Illuminator - July 2001
[WEB] Steve Jackson Games Daily Illuminator - July 2002
[WEB] Steve Jackson Games Daily Illuminator - December 2001
[WEB] Steve Jackson Games Daily Illuminator - February 2001
[WEB] Steve Jackson Games Daily Illuminator - January 2002
[WEB] Steve Jackson Games Daily Illuminator - March 2001
[WEB] Steve Jackson Games: Previously Shipped
[WEB] Steve Jackson Games: Now Shipping!
[WEB] The End Of D20 Weekly
[WEB] ERRATA—GURPS Vehicles --
[WEB] Fiction: Ogre Introductory Vignette, by Steve Jackson
[WEB] Notes on the Ogre, by Steve Jackson
[WEB] ERRATA—GURPS Space, 2nd Edition (2nd Printing) -- 1996 July 16
[WEB] ERRATA—Tribes --
[WEB] ERRATA—GURPS Vehicles --
[WEB] ERRATA—GURPS Space, 2nd Edition (2nd Printing) -- 1996 July 16
[WEB] Origins Award Winning!
[WEB] Going To Necronomicon!
[WEB] Loren And SMarsh At DragonCon!

References

External links
 
 Home page

GURPS writers
Living people
Role-playing game designers
Year of birth missing (living people)